Jepara is a regency in the northeast of the Indonesian province of Central Java. It covers an area of 1,004.13 km2 and had a population of 1,097,280 at the 2010 census and 1,184,947 at the 2020 census. Its capital is Jepara town.

History

People believed to have come from South Yunnan region migrated into the northern tip of Java during a time when Jepara was still separated by the Juwana Strait.

In the 16th century, Jepara was an important port; in early 1513, its king, Yunnus (Pati Unus) led an attack against Portuguese Malacca. His force is said to have been made up of one hundred ships and 5000 men from Jepara and Palembang but was defeated. Between 1518 and 1521 he apparently ruled over Demak. The rule of Ratu ('Queen') Kalinyamat in the latter 16th century was, however, Jepara's most influential. Jepara again attacked Malacca in 1551 this time with Johor but was defeated, and in 1574 besieged Malacca for three months.

It was the site of an English Fort in the 17th century. It is the birthplace of Indonesian national heroine Kartini.

Geography
Jepara Regency is located in the northeastern coastal region of Central Java, bordering Java Sea in the north and west, Kudus Regency and Pati Regency in the east, and Demak Regency in the south. The eastern border is primarily a mountainous region, with the most notable peak being Mount Muria. The regency also includes the Karimumjawa Archipelago, itself recognized as an administrative district, located in the Java Sea approximately 80 kilometres northwest from the mainland part of Jepara Regency.

Administrative Districts
Jepara Regency comprises sixteen districts (kecamatan), tabulated below with their areas and their populations at the 2010 census and the 2020 census. The table also includes the number of administrative villages (rural desa and urban kelurahan) in each district and its post code.

Contemporary Jepara
The population is almost entirely Javanese and over 95% Muslim. As a pesisir ('coastal') area many traders from around the world landed in Jepara centuries ago. As a result, some of Jepara's resident have at part European, Chinese, Arabs, Malay or Bugis ancestry.

The town is renowned its furniture industry. The production of teak furniture, employs approximately 80,000 people in the town, working in a large number of mainly small workshops. The trade has brought considerable prosperity to Jepara, well above the average for Central Java.

Tourism

Tourism in Jepara is an important component of the economy of Jepara and a significant source of tax revenue. Jepara is a town which known for their culinary, education, tourism, and rich cultural heritage. There are many possibilities and opportunities lies for the city to prosper and benefits more, but yet until now the government has not yet fully utilized them. Jepara although only a small town but has many tourist attractions, the mountain tourism, beach tourism, underwater tours, tour the islands. Foreign tourists often visit Tirto Samodra Beach (Bandengan Beach), Karimunjawa Islands (Crimon Java), Kartini Beach, etc.

References

External links
 Jepara Government 

Regencies of Central Java